The University of Dayton (UD) is a private, Catholic research university in Dayton, Ohio. Founded in 1850 by the Society of Mary, it is one of three Marianist universities in the United States and the second-largest private university in Ohio. The university's campus is in the city's southern portion and spans 388 acres on both sides of the Great Miami River. The campus is noted for the Immaculate Conception Chapel and the University of Dayton Arena.

In the fall of 2020, the university enrolled 11,347 full-time students from a variety of religious, ethnic, and geographic backgrounds. It offers more than 80 academic programs in the arts and sciences, business administration, education and health sciences, engineering and law. In 2009, UD offered what it believes to be one of the first undergraduate degree programs in human rights. It is classified among "R2: Doctoral Universities – High research activity".

The university's notable alumni include: Ohio Lieutenant Governor Jon Husted; humorist Erma Bombeck; engineer David Bradley; architect Bruce Graham; Super Bowl-winning coaches Jon Gruden and Chuck Noll; first female Premier of New South Wales Kristina Keneally; sportscaster Dan Patrick; and the 1987 Nobel Prize winner in Chemistry, Charles J. Pedersen.

History

Founding
In 1849, on a mission to establish a presence for the Society of Mary in America, the Rev. Leo Meyer, S.M., journeyed from Alsace in France to Cincinnati. But with a cholera epidemic raging to the north, Bishop John Baptist Purcell of the Cincinnati diocese, sent Father Meyer to Emmanuel parish in Dayton to tend to the sick. In Dayton, Father Meyer met local farmer John Stuart, who had lost his infant daughter Mary Louisa to cholera the year before. Heartbroken, Stuart and his wife wanted to sell their Dewberry Farm property and return to Europe.

On March 19, 1850, Father Meyer, joined by three Marianist brothers — teacher Maximin Zehler, cook Charles Schultz and gardener Andrew Edel — purchased the 125-acre hilltop farm from Stuart and renamed it Nazareth.  Stuart accepted a St. Joseph medal and a promise of $12,000 at 6 percent interest. The property included vineyards, an orchard, a mansion, various farm buildings, and the grave of Stuart's daughter, which Meyer promised to maintain.

Just a few months later, the University of Dayton had its beginnings on July 1, 1850, when St. Mary's School for Boys opened its doors to 14 primary students from Dayton. In September, the first boarding students arrived and classes moved to the mansion. Five years later, the school burned to the ground, but classes resumed within months. By 1860, when Brother Zehler became president, the enrollment was nearly 100 students. The Civil War had little direct effect on the school because most of the students were too young to serve. College preparatory classes started in 1861 along with a novitiate and school for Marianist candidates. The school would become Chaminade High School, named after the order's founder William Joseph Chaminade, which has since merged with the all-girls Julienne High school run by the Sisters of Notre Dame de Namur to form the co-educational Chaminade-Julienne High School.

The core of the Historic Campus was built during this time, starting in 1865 with Zehler Hall, the iconic Immaculate Conception Chapel in 1869, and St. Mary's Hall, then the tallest building in Dayton in 1870. In 1882 the university was incorporated and empowered to confer collegiate degrees by the State of Ohio.

Key events 
When floodwaters struck the community during the Great Dayton Flood of 1913, refugees fled to St. Mary's College high on a hill south of downtown Dayton. St. Mary's College was uniquely situated and equipped to provide relief to flood victims. Because students had not returned to campus from Easter break, the college was amply stocked with food and other provisions. Due to its location on the hill, electric light and heating plants were not affected, a plentiful clean water supply was available and the college had other essential facilities such as a laundry and infirmary. The college's kitchen provided meals to Miami Valley Hospital and provided 12,000 pounds of provisions to St. Elizabeth Hospital. The first night, 400 refugees took shelter at St. Mary's College; by the end of the week the number had grown to 600. In all, the college assisted 800 refugees. 
Known at various times as St. Mary's School, St. Mary's Institute and St. Mary's College, the school was incorporated as the University of Dayton in 1920 to reflect its close connection with the city of Dayton as well as to claim an American identity for its Catholic students.

In 1923, the university adopted the "Dayton Flyers" nickname for its athletic teams and adopted a university seal with the motto, "Pro Deo et Patria", Latin for "For God and Country." In the 1930s, women were admitted on an equal basis with men — 40 years before most Catholic universities allowed women. The school expanded its science and engineering programs and continued to attract the children and grandchildren of Catholic immigrants.

The growing Catholic presence in Dayton during the 1920s drew the hostility of the Ku Klux Klan, which focused that hostility toward the university. On Dec. 19, 1923, 12 bombs exploded throughout the campus and an 8-foot cross was set on fire. Several hundred Klansmen were routed by hundreds of neighborhood residents who joined students in chasing them off.

In June 2014, The University of Dayton announced it will begin divesting coal and fossil fuels from its $670 million investment pool. It is believed to be the first Catholic university in the nation to take this step.

Growth and expansion 
Starting in the 1960s, the university began acquiring hundreds of single-family homes and duplexes in the neighborhoods adjacent to the campus for student housing, extending the campus to Brown Street. In 2007, the university built five new townhouses and renovated four homes in a Citirama project with the Home Builders Association of Dayton.

In 2005, the university acquired a 49-acre parcel of land for $25 million that had once housed the cash register factory complex of the NCR Corp. The purchase extended the university's boundaries west to the Great Miami River and increased the total acreage to 216 acres.

In 2009, the university announced the purchase of another 115 acres from NCR for $18 million, including the former NCR World Headquarters and Old River Park, the former NCR employees' recreation area, extending the campus to 373 acres. The former NCR world headquarters, renamed as the 1700 South Patterson Building, now houses the University of Dayton Research Institute, classrooms, offices, and meeting space.

In 2010, GE Aviation announced it would build the $51 million GE Aviation Dayton Electrical Power Research Lab research and development facility on eight acres of the campus, becoming the first major new development on the former NCR land.

In 2012, the campus totaled approximately 388 acres and included 38 academic, research, athletic and administrative buildings, five residence halls, 18 student apartment complexes, and 473 residences, including 347 university-owned residences.

Enrollment grew to about 1,000 when World War II broke out. It reached more than 3,500 in 1950 with the return of the veterans and grew steadily. When the baby boomers hit college age, the university's enrollment topped 10,000. However, local enrollment decreased in the 1960s when Wright State University was established and Sinclair Community College was expanded, moving UD toward becoming a national university. In 2012, more than half of the undergraduates were from states other than Ohio. International enrollment has grown as well. In 2012 a record of more than 1,500 international students were enrolled.

Marianist tradition 
The University of Dayton was founded by priests and brothers in the tradition of the Society of Mary and is one of three Marianist universities in the U.S. It is a member of the Association of Marianist Universities and the Association of Catholic Colleges and Universities.

Although the university is not pontifical in character, the academic program of the university's International Marian Research Institute does have pontifical character and is affiliated with the Pontifical Theological Faculty Marianum in Rome.

Vowed Marianists governed the university until 1970, when the charter was amended and lay members joined the board of trustees. Vowed Marinists served as presidents through 2002, when Daniel J. Curran, Ph.D. became the university's 18th president and first lay leader. Eric F. Spina, PhD succeeded Dr. Curran in 2016 as the 19th president of the university. 

To sustain the Marianist identity and values of the university, Marianist Educational Associates were established in 2005 to educate lay leaders so the beliefs and traditions at the foundation of the Marianist educational philosophy could continue.

Presidents 
 Rev. Leo Meyer, S.M. (1850–1857)
 Br. John B. Stintzi, S.M. (1857–1860)
 Br. Maximin Zehler, S.M. (1860–1876)
 Rev. Francis E. Feith, S.M. (1876–1879)
 Rev. George Meyer, S.M. (1879–1887)
 Rev. John Harks, S.M. (1887–1889)
 Rev. Joseph Weckesser, S.M. (1889–1896)
 Rev. Charles Eichner, S.M. (1896–1902)
 Rev. Louis A. Tragesser, S.M. (1902–1908)
 Rev. Bernard P. O'Reilly, S.M. (1908–1918; 1923–1932)
 Rev. Joseph A. Tetzlaff, S.M. (1918–1923)
 Rev. Walter C. Tredtin, S.M. (1932–1938)
 Rev. John A. Elbert, S.M. (1938–1944)
 Rev. George J. Renneker, S.M. (1944–1953)
 Rev. Andrew L. Seebold, S.M. (1953–1959)
 Rev. Raymond A. Roesch, S.M. (1959–1979)
 Br. Raymond Fitz, S.M., Ph.D. (1979–2002)
 Daniel J. Curran, Ph.D. (2002–2016)
 Eric F. Spina, Ph.D. (2016– )

Campus

The University of Dayton's campus is located on approximately 388 acres  on the southern border of the city of Dayton. It is divided into four sections — Historic Campus, Campus West, River Campus, and Arena Sports Complex.  The campus includes 38 academic, research, athletic, and administrative buildings; five residence halls; 18 student apartment complexes; and 473 houses (347 of which are owned by the university).

Historic campus
The historic campus is compact and easy to navigate; one is generally able to cross it in less than 10 minutes. Many historic buildings survive from the early years of the university; newer buildings fit in with the established architecture (with a few exceptions, including RecPlex, Marianist Hall, ArtStreet, and Miriam Hall).

At the center of campus are St. Mary's Hall and the iconic Immaculate Conception Chapel, whose blue cupola inspired the university's logo. In early years, St. Mary's served as a dormitory and classroom; today, it holds the offices of the bursar, human resources, president, provost, and services for current students such as financial aid, registration, student employment, and veterans services.

St. Joseph Hall was built in 1884 as a residence hall. The interior was completely destroyed in a fire in 1987 and reopened in 1989. It houses the classrooms and offices for the social sciences and the university's Fitz Center for Leadership in Community.

Chaminade Hall, built in 1904, is named for Blessed William Joseph Chaminade, the founder of the Society of Mary. It is currently under construction.

Kettering Labs is home to the School of Engineering. Named after engineer and inventor Eugene Kettering, it includes classrooms, labs, offices, a machine shop, a wind tunnel, and the Innovation Center.

The Jesse Philips Humanities Center was built in 1993 and named for former university trustee Jesse Philips. It houses academic departments including American studies, English, history, languages, philosophy, and religious studies. It contains 20 classrooms, two computer centers, an international language lab, and a 180-seat recital hall.

Miriam Hall is home to the School of Business Administration and contains team-teaching, hands-on labs and seminar classrooms, including the Davis Center for Portfolio Management, the Crotty Center for Entrepreneurial Leadership, and the Hanley Trading Center. Miriam Hall is named for Dayton philanthropist Miriam Rosenthal, who played an important role in fundraising for the university.

The Science Center (the joint name for Sherman Hall, Wohlleben Hall, and a connecting central atrium) is home to the math, biology, physics, chemistry, geology, and premedicine departments.  This building includes classrooms, laboratories, offices, and auditoriums. Sherman and Wohlleben Halls were independent buildings until renovations in 2003 connected them with an atrium and study space.

Keller Hall opened in 1997 and is home to the University of Dayton School of Law. It has classrooms, offices, courtrooms, and a law library.

The John F. Kennedy Memorial Student Union (known as the Kennedy Union) is a popular gathering place for students. It houses a full-service dining facility, coffee shop, snack shop, and the Hangar — a games room with bowling lanes, pool tables, and video arcade. It also houses a copy center, travel agency, box office, meeting spaces, and the Boll Theatre.

The Central Mall is seven acres of green space at the heart of campus, surrounded by several academic and residential buildings. Renovation was completed in 2010.

The Roesch Library houses the university's main library, the Marian Library (which has the world's largest collection of materials on Mary, the mother of Jesus),  and the Ryan C. Harris Learning Teaching Center that includes team meeting spaces, distance learning and a student-run coffee shop. The print and electronic collections in Roesch Library include more than 1.3 million books and 69,000 journals.

The RecPlex opened in 2006. The 125,000-square-foot building's amenities include aerobics and cardiovascular rooms, a climbing wall, courts for basketball, floor hockey, lacrosse, racquetball, tennis. and volleyball; eight-lane swimming pool, indoor track, weight room, locker room, and lounge.

The Frericks Center has a 5,000-seat gym and was once known as the Fieldhouse prior to the construction of the University of Dayton Arena. It is now also home to the university's women's volleyball team.

The Cronin Athletics Center is used by all 17 Dayton Flyer intercollegiate sports programs. It recently underwent a $2.375 million renovation for larger offices, team meeting rooms, and indoor practice space for basketball, football, track and field, tennis, soccer, baseball, and softball.

Stuart Field was updated in 2011 with a synthetic turf to accommodate intramural and club sports.

Raymond L. Fitz Hall, previously named the College Park Center was originally owned by NCR, but bought by Dayton around 2005. Raymond L. Fitz Hall is home to numerous University departments, programs, and offices. These include: the Department of Art and Design, art gallery space, Brown Street Bistro, Center for Catholic Education, Central Receiving, Curriculum Materials Center, Dayton Early College Academy, Department of Physical Therapy, Facilities Management, Institute for Technology-Enhanced Learning, Mailing Services, Department of Music, Parking Services, Master of Physician Assistant Practice program, Department of Public Safety, School of Education and Health Sciences, Theatre, Dance, and Performance Technology Program, UDit Collaboration Center and Upward Bound.

The Shroyer Park Center research building is located on nine acres of land approximately one mile east of the core campus.

Jessie S. Hathcock Hall houses the computer science program was completed in 2021 and named in honor of Jessie Scott Hathcock, the first African-American woman to graduate from the university.

Campus West
In 2005, the University of Dayton purchased land and buildings adjacent to the western border of the historic campus. The $25 million purchase from NCR Corp. added 49 acres and increased the campus size nearly 25 percent.

Raymond L. Fitz Hall (formerly known as College Park Center) is the primary building on this section of campus. It houses a variety of campus offices and academic departments including UD Department of Public Safety (Police Department, Parking Services, and Student Volunteer Rescue Squad), facilities department; music and theater; visual arts; doctor of physical therapy; Dayton Early College Academy (DECA) charter school; physician assistant program; research labs; and the School of Education and Health Sciences.

The Graul Tennis Complex was completed in 2010 and features six regulation tennis courts, bleacher seating, restrooms, and changing facilities.

GE Aviation broke ground on a $51 million, 120,000-square-foot research facility in 2011 on the western edge of Campus West. The Electrical Power Integrated Systems Research and Development Center (EPISCENTER) opened in early 2014. The university's researchers work with GE to develop and deploy computer modeling, simulation and analysis of advanced, dynamic electric power systems design, and controls. The center is directed at several markets including end-to-end electrical power starter/ generation, conversion, distribution, and load technologies for civil and military aerospace applications.

Emerson Climate Technologies, a business of Emerson, announced its intent in 2014 to move forward with plans to build and support an innovation center at the University of Dayton to advance research and education for the global heating, ventilation, air conditioning and refrigeration (HVACR) industry. The center is located at the corner of Main and Stewart streets on nearly five acres of university-owned land.  The campus also includes several acres of undeveloped property.

River Campus
At the end of 2009, the university added 115 more acres to campus when it purchased NCR Corp's former world headquarters, which included a 455,000-square-foot building, 1,600-space parking lot, and a 48-acre park and nature preserve. The former HQ and  came under acquisition of the University of Dayton at a purchase price of $18 million.

The main building, Daniel J. Curran Place, houses the University of Dayton Research Institute, Center for Leadership, classrooms used by Master of Business Administration, School of Education, and Health Sciences programs, the Osher Lifelong Learning Institute, and the Alumni Center, among other offices.

Arena Sports Complex
The University of Dayton Sports Complex is located on the western edge of the campus, west of the Great Miami River and east of Interstate 75. It includes the University of Dayton Arena, with a seating capacity of 13,409, fields for men's baseball and women's softball, and Welcome Stadium, an 11,000-seat multi-purpose stadium owned by Dayton Public Schools that includes a football field and track used by all Dayton public high schools as well as the Dayton Flyers football team.

Academics

In U.S. News & World Reports 2021 ranking of national universities, University of Dayton was tied for 127th overall and 37th for "best value" in the U.S.

Schools, colleges, departments, and programs

College of Arts and Sciences
The College of Arts and Sciences is the largest of the five academic units with more than 50 undergraduate and graduate degree programs in 18 departments.  The university established one of the first undergraduate human rights studies program in the nation in 1998. Specialized institutes and centers provide in-depth opportunities for study, research and service in three areas. The Fitz Center for Leadership in Community emphasizes community building and outreach to urban neighborhoods and larger communities. The Institute for Pastoral Initiatives focuses on trends and developments in pastoral ministries for lay and vowed Catholics and offers online adult religious education to parishes around the world through the Virtual Learning Community for Faith Formation. The Center for Tissue Regeneration and Engineering at Dayton (TREND) conducts research in the areas of tissue regeneration and bioengineering with special interests in eye, bone and ear regeneration and engineering.

School of Education and Health Sciences
The School of Education and Health Sciences offers undergraduate and graduate education programs, online and in the classroom, ranging from early childhood to higher education. The school also is home to the Center for Catholic Education. The Lalanne Program is within the center and is a post-graduate teacher service program, specializing in supporting beginning Catholic school educators by combining service and teaching. Lalanne teachers make a two-year commitment to teach in an under-resourced Catholic school, live together in a faith-based community, and pursue professional and spiritual/personal development. The University of Dayton's SEHS began offering a Doctor of Education program in 2019.

School of Engineering
The School of Engineering offers eight undergraduate degree programs, 14 master's programs, and five Ph.D. programs. Students in the school have the opportunity to perform research in one of the school's 10 centers.

School of Business Administration
Flyer Enterprises manages a variety of on-campus businesses and is the sixth-largest student-run business in the nation with about 200 student employees in 10 divisions and annual revenues of more than $1.2 million. Several centers within the School of Business Administration offer specific focus on business topics and emphasize hands-on learning. The L. William Crotty Center for Entrepreneurial Leadership focuses on business development and provides funding for sophomores to start up and run real businesses. In the Davis Center for Portfolio Management, students manage nearly $60 million of the university's endowment. Other centers include the Hanley Trading Center the Center for Professional Selling, Center for Project Excellence, and Center for the Integration of Faith and Work. The Business Research Group conducts research for business and government partners. The university has also joined the Dayton Arcade restoration project, announcing the development of entrepreneurship initiative at the rebuilt Arcade.  The School of Business also offers several MBA programs, including its flexible option of obtaining an MBA online.

School of Law
The School of Law is one of nine in Ohio. In addition to a traditional Juris Doctor degree earned in three years, the university offers an accelerated two-year option. It was among the first in the nation to create a two-year option and a hybrid online J.D. program  In addition to the J.D. programs, the school offers graduate degrees in American and Transnational Law, including a Master of Laws (LL.M.) and a Master in the Study of Law (M.S.L.); a joint J.D./M.B.A. degree, a joint J.D./M.S. in Educational Administration degree, a joint J.D./M.P.A. Master of Public Administration degree, and an M.S.L. in Government Contracting, among others.

Intercultural and education abroad
The University of Dayton has nearly 50 programs for credit or service-learning for a summer, semester or full year abroad through the Center for International Programs. Students can participate in for-credit programs at a partner institution or through a program taught by UD faculty around the world. International programs are offered in Argentina, Austria, China, Czech Republic, Finland, France, Germany, Honduras, Hungary, Ireland, Italy, Korea, Mexico, Morocco, Netherlands, New Zealand, Nicaragua, Spain, and the United Kingdom.

The Center for Social Concern offers intercultural service-learning opportunities during breaks in the academic calendar. International programs are in Cameroon, Zambia, India, Ecuador, El Salvador, Panama, Belize, Mexico, and Guatemala. Students can also participate in domestic programs to experience cultural diversity within the United States. The new University of Dayton China Institute in Suzhou began offering classes in summer 2013.

After setting records for first-year international enrollment the past few years, in 2012 approximately one in 10 students was from another country. The University of Dayton's China Institute closed its doors in 2019.

A growing number of students, notably women, from predominantly Muslim countries are enrolling at the university, part of a trend of overseas Muslim women choosing Catholic colleges and universities. A New York Times story in 2012 noted the trend and featured the University of Dayton.

Libraries
The Roesch Library houses the university's main library, the Marian Library/International Marian Research Institute (IMRI), and the Ryan C. Harris Learning Teaching Center.

The University of Dayton Libraries, consisting of the Roesch Library, Marian Library/International Marian Research Institute, and University Archives and Special Collections, are the university's principal centers for the collection, dissemination and preservation of diverse information resources, Catholic and Marian collections and research, and the university's historical records. The print and electronic collections in Roesch Library include more than 1.3 million books and 69,000 journals. eCommons, a service of University Libraries, is a permanent multimedia archive of UD's education and research.

The University of Dayton's Marian Library/International Marian Research Institute (IMRI) is the world's largest repository of books, artwork, and artifacts devoted to Mary, the mother of Christ, and a pontifical center of research and scholarship with a vast presence in cyberspace.

Admissions
Admission to the University of Dayton has grown more selective since 2003 when 82 percent of applicants were accepted to 2015, when only 52 percent of applicants were accepted. Enrollment from out-of-state and international students also continues to increase; with about half of the undergraduate enrollment in coming from outside of Ohio and more than 10 percent of the total enrollment are international students.

In 2013, the university introduced an innovative net-price tuition plan with a four-year guarantee that a student's grants and scholarships would increase each year to cover any tuition increase. The plan eliminates additional fees and includes an option for free books. The plan drew national coverage from The Chronicle of Higher Education, Governing magazine  and was favorably reviewed by consumer advocate Clark Howard.

Tuition for the 2021–22 academic year is $44,890.

Research

The University of Dayton Research Institute has performed more than $2.5 billion in total sponsored research since its inception. Most of the research is done in engineering, either by 640 full-time researchers at the University of Dayton Research Institute (UDRI) or engineering faculty. More than 370 undergraduate and graduate students work alongside researchers.

Materials engineering accounts for most of the research within engineering, followed by electrical engineering. The university's engineering research played a role in GE Aviation's decision to locate the new Electrical Power Integrated Systems Research and Development Center (EPISCENTER) on the University of Dayton campus. The center opened in early 2014.

The Research Institute has seven divisions — Aerospace Mechanics, Energy And Environmental Engineering, Energy Technologies And Materials, Multi-Scale Composites And Polymers, Nonstructural Materials, Structural Integrity, and Sensor Systems.

There are 10 centers in School of Engineering.

Key discoveries
More than 150 patents have been assigned to the University of Dayton, including one for hotbags that Domino's Pizza uses to keep delivery pizzas hot. Bob Kauffman, a UDRI distinguished research chemist
and Fluid Analysis group leader, was an inventor of the Power Activated Technology for Conductor Healing (PATCH), a self-healing wire for which R&D Magazine gave a Top 100 Award. Kauffman also received Top 100 awards from R&D Magazine for the Remaining Useful Life Evaluation Routine (RULER), a "smart" dipstick used to measure the quality of oils in use in aircraft, automobiles, and cooking vats, and the Status and Motion Activated Radiofrequency Tag (SMART) Sensor, which is a modified, passive radio frequency identification (RFID) tag that becomes readable only after a monitored problem has occurred. The Research Institute also developed and operates the world's only test facility to certify sulkies that race in U.S. Trotting Association sanctioned events and was involved in creating an Engineered Material Arresting System (EMAS) installed at airports around the country to stop runaway aircraft.

Housing
More than 90 percent of undergraduates live in campus housing, making the University of Dayton one of the most residential campuses in the country. All first-year students are required to live in a residence hall. Sophomores are eligible to live in a residence hall or apartment, and juniors, seniors, and fifth-years are eligible to live in apartments or one of more than 300 University-owned houses.

Residence Halls

Located in the heart of campus, Founders Hall is U-shaped and houses 400 first-year students. Its lobby is shared by the entire building. Founders Hall is coed by floor, and all rooms are double occupancy, except for two rooms, which are quads. Founders was newly renovated during the summer of 2013.

Marianist Hall was built in 2004 and is composed of three separate wings. The east wing houses 128 first-year students, coed by floor, in double-occupancy rooms. The middle and west wings house 256 second-year students, coed by floor. A chapel, bookstore, credit union, food emporium, learning center, and post office are also located in Marianist Hall.

Marycrest Complex is the largest community housing on campus. It is coed by floor, has three sections that house 940 first-year students by floor and wing. Marycrest has double-occupancy rooms for first-year students, as well as a limited number of single-occupancy rooms. A dining facility is part of this complex. Marycrest also includes the late-night stop, Crest Express. Renovations were completed in summer 2007.

Stuart Complex is composed of three separate first-year student halls housing 632 students and sharing a common lobby. Before renovations in 2009, Adele Hall housed women, Meyer Hall housed men, and Sheehy Hall housed men and women, coed by floor. Now, each wing has both men and women co-ed by floor. All rooms are double occupancy. A convenience store known as "Stuart's Landing" is part of this complex.

Virginia W. Kettering Hall (VWK) houses 636 sophomores in 158 four-person suites and two 2-person suites. Each suite has a living room, two bedrooms, and a bathroom. Suites are furnished, have a small refrigerator, and are air-conditioned. The residence hall also contains a dining room for 500 students and two meeting rooms.

Apartments
The university owns a number of apartment buildings for student housing; these include the Lawnview Apartments (165 students in 42 suites), the Campus South (318 students in 53 suites), Garden Apartments (544 students in 138 suites), Plumwood Apartments with 55 suites for law and graduate students, and furnished apartments above Brown Street businesses in University Place.

In 2013, the university purchased three more condominium units at Irving Commons southeast of campus. The university already owned 54 beds and 60 leases.

The Caldwell Street Apartments opened in 2012 on six acres along Caldwell and Brown streets on the site of a former car dealership. The $25 million project houses more than 400 upperclass students in townhouse-style apartments.

ArtStreet opened in 2004 and offers townhouse and loft apartments to 58 juniors and seniors in the center of the south student neighborhood. ArtStreet combines living spaces with multi-purpose studio facilities and includes a student-run café, recording studio and WUDR Flyer Radio. In an effort to establish and expand the IACT program located at ArtStreet, the recording studio was dismantled and replaced with IACT offices in 2018.

Student Neighborhoods

The Ghetto, Darkside and "Far Side"
The University of Dayton has a unique feature: a large student neighborhood. Over time, the University of Dayton has acquired more than 300 houses adjacent to the historic campus. These properties used to belong to NCR and were used to house their employees. Most junior and senior-status students live in these houses. The university has been regularly renovating or rebuilding the houses to improve their condition. Most students refer to the South Student Neighborhood as "the Ghetto."  The Ghetto is bounded by Brown Street to the west, Irving Avenue to the south, Trinity Avenue and Evanston Avenue to the east, and Caldwell Street and Stonemill Road to the north. The Ghetto is located beside Oakwood, a small municipality south of Dayton. The area north of the campus center (North Student Neighborhood) is known as "the Darkside," due to the lack of streetlights when it was annexed. It is generally bordered by Brown Street to the west, Wyoming Street to the north, Woodland Cemetery to the east and Stuart Street to the south. The smallest neighborhood is called College Park, or alternatively, Holy Angels. It is located between the Ghetto and the Darkside.

The area adjacent to the Darkside, on the other side of Brown Street is known as "the Far Side", due to its distance from the center of the Ghetto. The "Far Side" is also known as the "Fairgrounds Neighborhood" and is bounded by Main St. to the west, Miami Valley hospital to the north, Brown St. to the East, and Stewart St. to the South.  The Fairgrounds Neighborhood comprises single family homes, once mainly inhabited by NCR employees, and has undergone extensive rehabilitation and gentrification over the past 20 years. UD students are rapidly taking up residences in this area for its lower prices. The university does not own this land, and the houses are rented from various landlords. The landlords also own approximately 115 houses on the Darkside as well as The Ghetto.

Student life

Community

The Commitment to Community, which highlights three principles adopted from the Catholic and Marianist vision of education, shapes the policies of the University of Dayton.  The three principles—"the dignity of every person" ,"the common good", and "community is essential for learning" — provide the foundation of the university's mission statement and aims as an educational institution. The influence of these principles can be found throughout the university's policies, behavioral expectations for students, and academic curriculum.

The Integrated Learning Living Communities (ILLCs) at the university provide students with an organized educational experience that focuses on a central topic. Topics include "Writing and the Arts", "Women in Science and Engineering", "Business and Marianist Values", and "Sustainability, Energy and the Environment". First-year students are assigned housing and placed in classes according to the ILLC they have selected.

Campus Ministry
The Office of Campus Ministry facilitates residence life ministries, liturgies, retreats, faith communities, and the Center for Social Concern. There are campus ministers in residence halls and in the student neighborhoods. UD employs a full-time Campus Minister of Interdenominational Ministry to help nurture the spiritual needs of students from various Protestant backgrounds. Campus Ministry also has support groups and offers spiritual guidance to students, faculty, and staff.

The Mass schedule includes daily and weekly Masses in residence halls, the chapel and the student neighborhood, a Spanish Mass, and a Black Catholic Mass.

Campus ministry offers several retreats throughout the year with different themes.

Student religious organizations on campus include Athletes in Action, Campus Crusade for Christ, Catholic Life, Chi Rho Catholic Men's Group, Muslim Student Association, Navigators, Orthodox Christian Fellowship, and Phi Lambda Iota Catholic Women's Group.

Service learning
The University of Dayton offers many service learning opportunities for students, regardless of their major. The Fitz Center for Leadership in Community and the Center for Social Concern are the most active organizers of service-learning opportunities. The Fitz Center houses the Dayton Civic Scholars, the Rivers Institute, Semester of Service, Neighborhood School Centers, Graduate Community Fellows, and Community Service Learning. The Center for Social Concern, which is part of campus ministry, offers "numerous opportunities for reflective service, service-learning, and education and advocacy for justice." The center provides many domestic and international service-learning opportunities during breaks in the academic calendar.

Christmas on Campus

Each year since 1964, usually on December 8, the Feast of the Immaculate Conception, University of Dayton students have hosted about 1,000 Dayton school children, giving them gifts and escorting them through campus for games, dancing, singing, crafts, face-painting, and Santa Claus. The event is free and open to the public and includes a live Nativity scene, a reading on the birth of Jesus, and the lighting of a Christmas tree. The evening ends with hundreds of students attending a Mass in the Immaculate Conception Chapel.

Ellie Kurtz, director of the University of Dayton's student union from 1964 to 1994, started Christmas on Campus as a way for students to celebrate Christmas before heading home for the winter break. "One night I was preoccupied with a sense of disappointment that students would be leaving for Christmas vacation and would not be able to celebrate Christmas with their friends and the UD family,"Kurtz said before her death in 2009, "I imagined what a wonderful Christmas we could have if we could celebrate Christmas before the students went home for the holidays".

Club and intramural sports
In addition to varsity athletics, there are 37 club and 12 intramural sports. In January 2006, the university opened RecPlex, a $25 million sports and recreational facility for students of the university. The Princeton Review has the University of Dayton first on its latest "Everybody Plays Intramural Sports" list.

The men's lacrosse club team won the 2015 Men's Collegiate Lacrosse Association Division II national championship.

Student-run media
The University of Dayton has a student newspaper (Flyer News), student-run radio station (WUDR Flyer Radio 99.5/98.1 FM), student-run TV station Flyer Station, and Orpheus Art & Literary Magazine (the oldest student ran organization).

Greek life
Fraternities and sororities have been a part of student life at the University of Dayton since 1933 and have been formally recognized since 1967. In 2015–16, 15 percent of undergraduate men and 22 percent of undergraduate women are members of a fraternity or sorority. The Interfraternity Council (IFC),  National Pan-Hellenic Council (NPHC) and College Panhellenic Council (Panhel) have official responsibility for governing their respective groups. The Interfraternity Council is the governing body for six of UD's fraternal organizations. The fraternities recognized by the Interfraternity Council are:
 Alpha Nu Omega
 Beta Theta Pi
 Phi Kappa Psi
 Phi Sigma Kappa
 Pi Kappa Phi
 Sigma Alpha Epsilon
The Pan-Hellenic Council is the governing body for eight sororities: 
 Alpha Phi
 Chi Omega
 Kappa Delta
 Phi Sigma Rho
 Pi Beta Phi
 Sigma Kappa
 Theta Phi Alpha
 Zeta Tau Alpha
The National Pan-Hellenic Council is the governing body composed of the nine international fraternities and sororities. The council currently has five active groups at the University of Dayton, including two men's groups and three women's groups. These organizations are:
 Alpha Kappa Alpha
 Alpha Phi Alpha
 Kappa Alpha Psi
 Delta Sigma Theta
 Zeta Phi Beta

Athletics

The Dayton Flyers compete in the Atlantic 10 Conference in all sports except football, in which they compete in the Pioneer Football League. The Flyers' mascot is "Rudy Flyer," a pun based on the university's initials, "U.D."  Rudy is a barnstorming pilot who wears 1930s-1940s-era goggles and a leather pilot's helmet. The nickname "Flyers" is a tribute to the Wright Brothers who began their careers and invented the airplane in Dayton. The fight song is "Victory."

The university sponsors 16 sports: men's and women's basketball, men's and women's cross country, men's and women's golf, men's and women's soccer, men's and women's tennis, baseball, football, softball, women's volleyball, women's rowing, and women's track.

Dayton's historic rivalries in most sports have involved fellow Southwest Ohio schools—the University of Cincinnati, Miami University, and Xavier University. Dayton and Xavier played for the Blackburn/McCafferty Trophy during their regular season men's basketball matchups before Xavier moved to the Big East Conference.

Historical highlights
The men's basketball team reached the 1967 NCAA Division I Men's Basketball Championship final game and won the National Invitational Tournament in 1962, 1968, and 2010. In 2014, the men's basketball Flyers made it to the NCAA Elite Eight after upsetting sixth-seeded Ohio State, third-seeded Syracuse, and 10th-seeded Stanford. The football team won NCAA Division III national titles in 1980 and 1989 and finished runner-up in 1981, 1987, and 1991. The Sports Network also named the Flyers football squad the nation's top Football Championship Subdivision mid-major program in 2007. The women's basketball team won the American Association of Intercollegiate Athletics for Women (AIAW) Division II national championship in 1980, a year after finishing as runner-up. The women's volleyball team appeared in the NCAA tournament 15 years (2003, ‘04, ‘05, ‘07, ‘08, ‘09, ‘10, ‘11, ‘12, ‘14, ‘15, ‘16, ‘18, ‘19, '21). The women's soccer team has appeared in the NCAA tournament 10 times (1996, 1999, 2001, 2003, 2004, 2009, 2010, 2011, 2014, 2016).

University of Dayton Arena
The University of Dayton Arena has hosted more Division I Men's Basketball Championship games (125) than any other venue in America. Since 2001, the University of Dayton has hosted the beginning of the NCAA Division I men's basketball tournament.

Men's basketball program
Flyers basketball is one of the biggest sports attractions in the Dayton area with the Flyers perennially ranking in the NCAA Division I top 30 in basketball attendance. UD's spirit group, the Red Scare, supports many of the Flyers athletics teams. From its inception in 1996 until 2006, Red Scare was focused primarily on men's basketball. In 2007, the focus of Red Scare expanded to other sports including baseball and softball in the spring, football, men's and women's soccer, and volleyball in the fall, and men's and women's basketball in the winter. The Red Scare expanded other sports' fan base with the creation of a points system called "Spirit Points".  Students are given points for each sporting event they attend.  These points are then used to obtain a quality seat at the men's basketball games. As of the 2014 school year, the point system was revoked and Red Scare returned to the "first come, first served" model for basketball ticket distribution.

A 2013 Emory University study by sports marketing professors Manish Tripathi and Michael Lewis listed Flyers men's basketball fans the best among non-power conference schools.

Notable people

Faculty

Bob Taft, distinguished research associate in the School of Education — Former two-term governor of Ohio. Great-grandson of President Taft.

Alumni outside of sports
David J. Bradley '71 - inventor of the "Control-Alt-Delete" computer keyboard command
Chip Bok '74 - two-time National Cartoonist Society (NCS) editorial cartoonist of the year
Erma Bombeck '49 - humorist and newspaper columnist
Erica Chenoweth '02 - named by Foreign Policy magazine as one of the 100 Leading Global Thinkers of 2013.
Michael B. Coleman (JD '80) - first African-American mayor of Columbus, Ohio
Tom Demmer '08 - member of the Illinois House of Representatives
Joseph Desch '26 - creator of decoding machine to crack Nazi Enigma code in World War II
Michael Eismann '04 - IEEE fellow and chief scientist at the Air Force Research Laboratory
Theresa Flores, sex-trafficking activist
Bruce Graham - architect of the Willis Tower (formerly Sears Tower)
Ray Gricar - District attorney of Centre County, Pennsylvania
Jon A. Husted '89, '93 (MA) - Ohio Lieutenant Governor (2019–Present)
Gregory Karle (B.S.'77) (J.D.'80) Politician, Retired, City Solicitor (City attorney) of Erie, Pennsylvania (1994-2018). Argued and won Landmark First Amendment case at the Supreme Court of the United States.
Kristina Keneally '91 - first female Premier of New South Wales
Bill Klesse '81 - CEO of Valero Energy
Omar J. Marrero, Secretary of State of Puerto Rico
Scott Douglas Miller, President of Virginia Wesleyan University, former president of Bethany College, Wesley College, and Lincoln Memorial University
Don Novello (stage name Father Guido Sarducci) '64 - actor, writer and comedian
James Oliver, the first Black graduate of [[University of Mississippi Medical Center.
Charles J. Pedersen '26 - winner of 1987 Nobel Prize in Chemistry
Bob Schaffer '84 - U.S. Congressman from Colorado
Amy Schneider - Jeopardy! champion with the second longest winning streak 
Jerry Sharkey '65 - historic preservationist and Wright brothers historian, conceived idea for Dayton Aviation Heritage National Historical Park
Richard Schoen '72 - Wolf Prize in Mathematics winner for "striking contributions to analysis and geometry."
Candace Smith - actress and model, Miss Ohio USA 2003, "Survivor" contestant
Mike Turner '92 - (Graduate of Business School) - Member of the U.S. House of Representatives from Ohio's 10th congressional district
Charles W. Whalen, Jr. '42 - U.S. Congressman from Ohio's 3rd congressional district (1967–1979), author
Nan Whaley '98 - Politician, mayor of the city of Dayton
Jessie Scott Hathcock '30 - First African American woman graduate, humanitarian, educator, and civil rights leader

Alumni in sports 
Don "Monk" Meineke '52 - former NBA player 1952-1958 and First NBA Rookie of the Year
Obi Toppin - NBA player, New York Knicks
Jerry Blevins - pitcher, New York Mets
Bucky Bockhorn '58 - former NBA player
Bob DeMarco '59 - former NFL player, All-Pro center for St. Louis Cardinals
Fred Dugan '57 - former NFL player
Gerry Faust '58 - head football coach at the University of Notre Dame
Anthony Grant '87 - current University of Dayton men's basketball coach
Jon Gruden '86 - Super Bowl-winning head coach (2002) of the Tampa Bay Buccaneers; former Las Vegas Raiders head coach
Mike Hauschild - pitcher, Texas Rangers
Chris Johnson '12 - NBA player, Utah Jazz,  player in the Israeli Basketball Premier League
Emil Karas '58 - former NFL player
Jim Katcavage '56, - All-Pro defensive tackle for the NFL New York Giants
Ally Malott '15 - WNBA player, Washington Mystics
Don May '68 - professional basketball player 1968–1975
Chuck Noll '53 - four-time Super Bowl winning head coach (Pittsburgh Steelers 1975, 1976, 1979, 1980.  Inducted into the Pro Football Hall of Fame in 1993)
Dan Patrick '79 - sportscaster with NBC Sports
Brian Roberts '08 - NBA player, Charlotte Hornets
Chris Rolfe '05 - professional soccer player for D.C. United. Also played on United States Men's National Soccer Team in 2005
David Abidor '13 - soccer player
Devon Scott '15 - basketball player in the Israel Basketball Premier League
Craig Stammen - pitcher, Washington Nationals and San Diego Padres
Chris Wright '11 - professional basketball player
Brandon Staley - current Los Angeles Chargers Head Coach

References

External links

 
Educational institutions established in 1850
Marianist universities and colleges
Marianist schools
Association of Catholic Colleges and Universities
Universities and colleges in Dayton, Ohio
Catholic universities and colleges in Ohio
Roman Catholic Archdiocese of Cincinnati
1850 establishments in Ohio